Park River is a city in Walsh County, North Dakota, United States. The population was 1,424 at the 2020 census. Park River was founded in 1884.

In 1903, a Park River blacksmith named Samuel Holland built a motor car called the Holland Special. He built at least five more cars between 1903 and 1908.

Geography
Park River is located at  (48.395443, −97.745375).

Demographics

2010 census
At the 2010 census, there were 1,403 people, 643 households and 360 families living in the city. The racial make-up of the population was 97.0% White, 1.3% Native American, 0.2% Asian, 0.4% from other races and 1.1% from two or more races. Hispanic or Latino people of any race were 2.4%.

Of the 643 households, 23.5% had children under the age of 18 living with them, 44.6% were married couples living together, 8.6% had a female householder with no husband present, 2.8% had a male householder with no wife present and 44.0% were non-families. 39.7% of households were one person and 20.6% were one person aged 65 or older. The average household size was 2.07 and the average family size was 2.80.

The median age was 49.4 years. 21.2% of residents were under the age of 18; 4.3% were between the ages of 18 and 24; 19.1% were from 25 to 44; 28.1% were from 45 to 64; and 27.5% were 65 or older. The sex make-up of the city was 49.0% male and 51.0% female.

2000 census
At the 2000 census,, there were 1,535 people, 660 households and 390 families living in the city. The racial make-up of the population was 95.57% White, 0.07% African American, 1.63% Native American, 0.07% Asian, 1.56% from other races and 1.11% from two or more races. Hispanic or Latino people of any race were 2.61% of the population.

Of the 660 households, 27.0% had children under the age of 18 living with them, 47.9% were married couples living together, 8.8% had a female householder with no husband present and 40.8% were non-families. 38.0% of households were one person and 20.8% were one person aged 65 or older. The average household size was 2.18 and the average family size was 2.88.

22.1% of the population were under the age of 18, 6.3% from 18 to 24, 20.9% from 25 to 44, 22.1% from 45 to 64 and 28.5% were 65 or older. The median age was 45 years. For every 100 females, there were 87.4 males. For every 100 females age 18 and over, there were 78.9 males.

The median household income was $30,347 and the median family income was $40,000. Males had a median income of $26,154 and females $20,769. The per capita income was $15,990. About 6.8% of families and 7.8% of the population were below the poverty line, including 9.1% of those under age 18 and 7.2% of those age 65 or over.

Climate
This climatic region is typified by large seasonal temperature differences, with warm to hot (and often humid) summers and cold (sometimes severely cold) winters.  According to the Köppen Climate Classification system, Park River has a humid continental climate, abbreviated "Dfb" on climate maps.

Notable people

 Roger Allin, fourth governor of North Dakota
 Fred Hultstrand, professional photographer who had Hulstrand Studio in Park River
 Al McIntosh, newspaper editor whose columns are featured in Ken Burns' The War
 William Rockefeller Sr., father of John D. Rockefeller, lived in Park River for a period of time
 Paul Thorlakson, Canadian doctor

See also
 List of cities in North Dakota

References

External links

Cities in Walsh County, North Dakota
Cities in North Dakota
Populated places established in 1884
1884 establishments in Dakota Territory